The knockout stage of the 2003–04 UEFA Champions League ran from 24 February 2004 until the final at the Arena AufSchalke in Gelsenkirchen, Germany on 26 May 2004. The knockout stage involved the 16 teams that finished in the top two in each of their groups in the group stage.

Times are CET/CEST, as listed by UEFA (local times are in parentheses).

Format
Each tie in the knockout stage, apart from the final, was played over two legs, with each team playing one leg at home. The team that had the higher aggregate score over the two legs progressed to the next round. In the event that aggregate scores finished level, the team that scored more goals away from home over the two legs progressed. If away goals were also equal, 30 minutes of extra time were played. If there were goals scored during extra time and the aggregate score was still level, the visiting team qualified by virtue of more away goals scored. If no goals were scored during extra time, the tie was decided via a penalty shoot-out.

In the draw for the round of 16, matches were played between the winner of one group and the runner-up of a different group, with matches not allowed between teams from the same country.

In the final, the tie was played over just one leg at a neutral venue. If scores were level at the end of normal time in the final, extra time was played, followed by penalties if the score remained tied.

Qualified teams

Bracket

Round of 16 

|}

First leg

Second leg 

Chelsea won 1–0 on aggregate.

Deportivo La Coruña won 2–0 on aggregate.

Lyon won 2–0 on aggregate.

Porto won 3–2 on aggregate.

Arsenal won 5–2 on aggregate.

Milan won 4–1 on aggregate.

2–2 on aggregate; Monaco won on away goals.

Real Madrid won 2–1 on aggregate.

Quarter-finals 

|}

First leg

Second leg 

5–5 on aggregate; Monaco won on away goals.

Chelsea won 3–2 on aggregate.

Deportivo La Coruña won 5–4 on aggregate.

Porto won 4–2 on aggregate.

Semi-finals 

|}

First leg

Second leg 

Porto won 1–0 on aggregate.

Monaco won 5–3 on aggregate.

Final 

As winners of the competition, Porto went on to represent UEFA at the 2004 Intercontinental Cup.

Notes

External links
 2003-04 season at UEFA website 

Knockout Stage
2003-04